Doukades is a village and a community in the northwestern part of the island of Corfu.  It is located in the municipal unit of Palaiokastritsa.  In 2011 its population was 630 for the village and 724 for the community, including the village Papathanatika. Hills dominate the area.

Population

History

According to I. Bounia, the name of the settlement came from its first inhabitants who bore the name Doukas (Δούκας, meaning duke). The earliest written reference to Doukades is a notary writing from 1616. Of interest are the restored stone mansion of the family Theotokis, the Venetian type "Sagrado" of Kouartano, and the building of the elementary school at the entrance of the village.

Doukades was characterized as a traditional settlement with the law of October 19, 1978 No. 594 IV / November 13, 1998 (Codical statistics, number 22.1.137.01).

See also
List of settlements in the Corfu regional unit

References

External links
 Doukades at the GTP Travel Pages

Populated places in Corfu (regional unit)